Chilabothrus exsul, the Abaco Island boa or Northern Bahamas boa, is a boa species found in the Bahamas. No subspecies are currently recognized. Like all other boas, it is not venomous.

Description
Slender and terrestrial with an iridescent reddish sheen.

Distribution and habitat
Found in the Bahamas on Grand Bahama Island and Great Abaco Island, including Elbow Cay and Little Abaco Island. The type locality given is "Near Blackrock (approximately 26°49'N. lat. and 77°25'30"W. long.) on the east coast of Great Abaco in the Bahamas."

References

Further reading

 Dirksen L, Auliya M. 2001. Zur Systematik und Biologie der Riesenschlangen (Boidae). -Draco, Münster, 2(1): 4–19.
 Netting, M.G. & C.J. Goin. 1944. Another new boa of the genus Epicrates from the Bahamas. Annals of the Carnegie Museum 30:71-76.
 Tolson PJ, Henderson RW. The natural history of West Indian boas. R & A Publishing Limited, Somerset, UK, 1993, 125 pp.

External links
 

exsul
Reptiles described in 1944
Taxa named by M. Graham Netting
Endemic fauna of the Bahamas
Reptiles of the Bahamas
Snakes of the Caribbean